Viktorija Karatajūtė-Šarauskienė  (12 December 1948 Vilnius – 2007) was a Lithuanian ceramic artist.

Biography
In 1971, she graduated from the Lithuanian Institute of Fine Arts. In 1971–1996, she was a Vilnius Painting Factory artist.

Works
Creator of ornamental panels (Vilnius Antokolskio home interiors and exteriors, 1995–1996, all with the designer's brother R. Karatajus), decorative compositions ("Welcome" in 1974, "Mood" in 1980, festive decorations 1983, "Butterfly Festival" in 1998), installations (Spring 2002).  Conceptual works, associative, poetic, bright colors, often conveys the mood of nature motifs. Clay and porcelain compositions in combination with different materials.

Since 1972, she has participated in exhibitions, individual exhibitions held in Vilnius and Kaunas in 1986, with V. Karatajus in Vilnius in 1994, 1998.
The presence of the international symposia on ceramics in Lithuania and abroad. Her works are to Lithuanian Art Museum, National Museum of Fine Arts Čiurlionis.
She showed at lietuvos galerija

See also
List of Lithuanian painters

References

Viktorija Karatajūtė-Šarauskienė, Lithuanian Wikipedia

Lithuanian painters
1948 births
Living people
Artists from Vilnius
Vilnius Academy of Arts alumni
20th-century Lithuanian women artists
21st-century Lithuanian women artists